Herman, Baron Vanden Berghe (Herman van den Berge) (born Overboelare, 12 June 1933, died Oud-Heverlee, 23 January 2017) was a Belgian pioneer in human genetics. He founded the Centrum voor Menselijke Erfelijkheid (Center for Human Genetics) at the medical faculty of the Catholic University of Leuven in Leuven (Louvain), Belgium. He was a cytogeneticist and applied cytogenetics to oncology. Among other findings, he discovered the deletion 5q syndrome in myelodysplasia. A native Flemish-speaker, he was also fluent in a number of other languages, including French and English, which facilitated his international role in medical genetics.

Professor Vanden Berghe was granted the title of Baron by Baudouin I, King of Belgium and from 2000 to 2003 served as chairman of the King Baudouin Foundation. He was a founding member of the International Forum for Biophilosophy established in Belgium by Royal Decree in 1988. The Forum is responsible for the Golden Eurydice Award.

See also
 Flanders Institute for Biotechnology (VIB)

Notes

References
 Janssen J et al., Clonal analysis of myelodysplastics syndromes – evidence of multipotent stem-cell origin, Blood, 73, 248–254, 1989.
 Arthur DC et al., The clinical-significance of karyotype in acute myelogenous leukemia, Cancer Genet Cytogen, 40, 203–216, 1989.
 Herman Van Den Berghe leaving Leuven University as an emeritus (in Dutch)
 Herman Van den Berghe, entry in Who Named It

1933 births
2017 deaths
Belgian geneticists
Academic staff of KU Leuven
Flemish scientists
Members of the European Academy of Sciences and Arts